Theodore Stanislaus Andrulewicz (January 1, 1905January 3, 1996) was an American football fullback/halfback who played for Newark Tornadoes in National Football League. He played college football at Villanova University, participating in 11 regular season games over 1 season in 1930. He had one receiving touchdown.

Early and family history
Teddy Andrulewicz was born in Mount Carmel, Pennsylvania to Thomas and Scholastica Pozniak Andrulewicz. Incidentally, he may have been related to Antoni Pozniak, a soldier in Soviet Russia, through both of his parents. His father's relative was Bronislawa "Bernice" Bronislawa Pozniak née Andrulewiczówna, who was murdered in the Holocaust, and she was married to Bronislaw Pozniak.

References

External links
 Fantasy Football Challenge
 

1905 births
1996 deaths
People from Mount Carmel, Pennsylvania
Players of American football from Pennsylvania
American football fullbacks
American football halfbacks
Villanova Wildcats football players
Newark Tornadoes players
Jewish American sportspeople
20th-century American Jews